Bence Gundel-Takács (born 6 April 1998) is a Hungarian football player who plays for Budafok.

Career

Újpest
On 12 May 2018, Gundel-Takács played his first match for Újpest in a 0–1 loss against Puskás Akadémia in the Hungarian League.

Fehérvár FC
On 29 August 2019 Fehérvár FC announced, that they had signed Gundel-Takács.

Budafok
On 9 July 2022, Gundel-Takács signed with Budafok.

Club statistics

Updated to games played as of 19 May 2019.

References

External links

1998 births
Living people
Footballers from Budapest
Hungarian footballers
Hungary youth international footballers
Association football goalkeepers
Puskás Akadémia FC players
Újpest FC players
Fehérvár FC players
Győri ETO FC players
Budafoki LC footballers
Nemzeti Bajnokság I players
Nemzeti Bajnokság II players
Nemzeti Bajnokság III players
First Football League (Croatia) players
Hungarian expatriate footballers
Expatriate footballers in Croatia
Hungarian expatriate sportspeople in Croatia